Cannistown Church is a medieval church and National Monument in County Meath, Ireland.

Location

History

Ardsallagh (Irish árd saileach, "height of willows") is believed to be on the site of an early Christian monastery founded by Finnian of Clonard in the sixth century, known by various names: Escair-Branain (Brenan's ridge) Ard-bren-n Domnuich (Height of Brenan's church) or Airdleac (High stone). One hagiography claims that Saint Senach was educated by Finnian at Ardsallagh.

Cannistown Church, dedicated to Brigit of Kildare, was probably built in the 12th century by the de Angulo / Nangle family, the Anglo-Normans to whom Cannistown was granted by Hugh de Lacy, Lord of Meath. It was the parish church from the 13th century onward, and was rebuilt in the 15th/16th century, but some original features remain, most notably the chancel. A church at "Ardsalach" is listed in the ecclesiastical taxation (1302–06) of Pope Nicholas IV. The church was closed around the time of the Reformation: in 1612, George Montgomery, Church of Ireland Bishop of Meath, described it as "in ruins."

Church

The church consists of a nave and chancel with high gables, and the remains of a bell-gable in the west. The arch leading into the chancel is of particular interest: Carved stones on each side of the arch show three dogs attacking an otter or fox, and another carving of three men, possibly depicting the Arrest of Jesus. There is a single lancet window and an ambry (recess for storing sacred vessels and vestments) at ground level on the north wall and a surviving lancet and piscina at the east end of the south wall. There is a small bullaun stone in the nave.

References

Churches in County Meath
Archaeological sites in County Meath
National Monuments in County Meath
Former churches in the Republic of Ireland